Krępiec  is a village in the administrative district of Gmina Mełgiew, within Świdnik County, Lublin Voivodeship, in eastern Poland.

Architecture and monuments 
 Old chapel built in XIX of century.
 mill built in '20 age of XX century

References

Villages in Świdnik County